In Judaism and Christianity, the tree of the knowledge of good and evil is one of two specific trees in the story of the Garden of Eden in Genesis 2–3, along with the tree of life. Alternatively, some scholars have argued that the tree of the knowledge of good and evil is just another name for the tree of life. This is unlikely, though, because the Bible clearly treats them as two separate trees.

In Genesis

Narrative
Genesis 2 narrates that God places the man, Adam, in a garden with trees of whose fruits he may eat, but forbids him to eat from "the tree of the knowledge of good and evil." God forms woman, Eve, after this command is given. In Genesis 3, a serpent persuades Eve to eat from its forbidden fruit and she also lets Adam taste it. Consequently, God expels them from the garden.

Meaning of good and evil
The phrase in Hebrew,  literally translates as "good and evil". This may be an example of the type of figure of speech known as merism, a literary device that pairs opposite terms together in order to create a general meaning, so that the phrase "good and evil" would simply imply "everything". This is seen in the Egyptian expression "evil-good", which is normally employed to mean "everything". However, if "tree of the knowledge of good and evil" is to be understood to mean a tree whose fruit imparts knowledge of everything, this phrase does not necessarily denote a moral concept. This view is held by several scholars.

Given the context of disobedience to God, other interpretations of the implications of this phrase also demand consideration. Robert Alter emphasizes the point that when God forbids the man to eat from that particular tree, he says that if he does so, he is "doomed to die." The Hebrew behind this is in a form regularly used in the Hebrew Bible for issuing death sentences.

However, there are myriad modern scholarly interpretations regarding the term (Hada'at tov wa-ra "the knowledge of good and evil") in Genesis 2–3, such as wisdom, omniscience, sexual knowledge, moral discrimination, maturity, and other qualities. According to scholar Nathan French, the term likely means "the knowledge for administering reward and punishment," suggesting that the knowledge forbidden by Yahweh and yet acquired by the humans in Genesis 2–3 is the wisdom for wielding ultimate power.

Religious views

Judaism
Jewish sources suggest different possible identities for the tree: a fig tree (as fig leaves were used to cloth Adam and Eve after the sin), a grape vine (as "nothing brings wailing to the world like wine"), a stalk of wheat (as "a child does not know how to say Father and Mother until he tastes grain"), an etrog (as the description in  matches the etrog fruit's beautiful appearance, or else the etrog tree's allegedly tasty bark), or a nut tree.

In Jewish tradition, the Tree of Knowledge and the eating of its fruit represents the beginning of the mixture of good and evil together. Before that time, the two were separate, and evil had only a nebulous existence in potential. While free choice did exist before eating the fruit, evil existed as an entity separate from the human psyche, and it was not in human nature to desire it.

According to Rashi, the sin came about because Eve added an additional clause to the divine command: "Neither shall you touch it." By saying this, Eve added to YHWH's command, and thereby came to detract from it, as it is written: "Do not add to His Words". However, In Legends of the Jews, it was Adam who had devoutly forbidden Eve to touch the tree even though God had only mentioned the eating of the fruit.

According to one source, Eve also fed the fruit to the animals, leading to their mortality as well.

Since evil no longer had independent existence, it henceforth depended on holiness to draw down the Divine life-force, on whose "leftovers" it then feeds and derives existence. Once evil is separated from holiness through , its source of life is cut off, causing the evil to disappear. This is accomplished through observance of the 613 commandments in the Torah, which deal primarily with physical objects wherein good and evil are mixed together. The sin of the Tree caused God's presence (Shechinah) to depart from earth; in kabbalah, the task of  rectifies the sin of the Tree and causes the Shechinah to return.

Christianity

In Christian tradition, consuming the fruit of the tree of knowledge of good and evil was the original sin committed by Adam and Eve that led to the fall of man in Genesis 3.

In Catholicism, Augustine of Hippo taught that the "tree" should be understood both symbolically and as a real tree – similarly to Jerusalem being both a real city and a figure of Heavenly Jerusalem. Augustine underlined that the fruits of that tree were not evil by themselves, because everything that God created "was good". It was disobedience of Adam and Eve, who had been told by God not to eat off the tree, that caused disorder in the creation, thus humanity inherited sin and guilt from Adam and Eve's sin.

In Western Christian art, the fruit of the tree is commonly depicted as the apple, which originated in central Asia. According to the Bible, there is nothing to show the forbidden fruit of the tree of knowledge was necessarily an apple.

Gnosticism
Uniquely, the Gnostic religion held that the tree was entirely positive or even sacred. Per this saga, it was the archons who told Adam and Eve not to eat from its fruit, before lying to them by claiming they would die after tasting it. Later in the story, an instructor is sent from the Pleroma by the aeons to save humanity and reveal gnosis. This savior does so by telling Adam and Eve that eating the fruit is the way into salvation. Examples of the narrative can be found within the Gnostic manuscripts On the Origin of the World and the Secret Book of John.

Manichaeism, which has been considered a Gnostic sect, echoes these notions as well, presenting the primordial aspect of Jesus as the instructor.

Islam

The Quran never refers to the tree as the "tree of the knowledge of good and evil" but rather typically refers to it as "the tree" or (in the words of Iblis) as the "tree of immortality." Muslims believe that when God created Adam and Eve, he told them that they could enjoy everything in the Garden except this tree and so Satan appeared to them, telling them the only reason God forbade them to eat from the tree was that they would become angels or immortal.

When they ate from this tree, their nakedness appeared to them, and they began to sew together leaves from the Garden for their covering. The Quran mentions the sin as being a 'slip'. Consequently, they repented to God and asked for his forgiveness, and were forgiven.

In Quran Al-A'raf 27, God states:

Similar depictions in Akkadian seal
A cylinder seal, known as the Adam and Eve cylinder seal, from post-Akkadian periods in Mesopotamia ( century BCE) has been linked to the Adam and Eve story. Assyriologist George Smith (1840–1876) described the seal as having two facing figures (male and female) seated on each side of a tree, holding out their hands to the fruit, while between their backs is a serpent, giving evidence that the fall of man account was known in early times of Babylonia.

The British Museum disputes this interpretation, and holds that it is a common image from the period depicting a male deity being worshipped by a woman, with no reason to connect the scene with the Book of Genesis.

See also
 Adam and Eve (Latter Day Saint movement)
 Dream of the Rood
 Enlightenment (spiritual)
 Original sin

References

Bibliography

External links

Adam and Eve
Biblical phrases
Christian mythology
Jewish mysticism
Jewish mythology
Trees in Christianity
Garden of Eden
Kabbalistic words and phrases
Bereshit (parashah)